Vitivirus is a genus of viruses in the order Tymovirales, in the family Betaflexiviridae. Plants serve as natural hosts. There are 15 species in this genus.

Taxonomy
The genus contains the following species:

Actinidia virus A
Actinidia virus B
Arracacha virus V
Blackberry virus A
Grapevine virus A
Grapevine virus B
Grapevine virus D
Grapevine virus E
Grapevine virus F
Grapevine virus G
Grapevine virus H
Grapevine virus I
Grapevine virus J
Grapevine virus K
Grapevine virus L
Grapevine virus M
Grapevine virus N
Grapevine virus O
Heracleum latent virus
Mint virus 2

Structure
Viruses in Vitivirus are non-enveloped, with flexuous and filamentous geometries. The diameter is around 12 nm. Genomes are linear, around 7.6kb in length. The genome codes for 5 proteins.

Life cycle
Viral replication is cytoplasmic, and is lysogenic. Entry into the host cell is achieved by penetration into the host cell. Replication follows the positive stranded RNA virus replication model. Positive stranded RNA virus transcription is the method of transcription. The virus exits the host cell by tubule-guided viral movement. Plants serve as the natural host. The virus is transmitted via a vector (mechanical inoculation pseudococcid mealybugs and aphids). Transmission routes are vector and mechanical.

References

External links
 Viralzone: Vitivirus
 ICTV
 UniProt Taxonomy

Betaflexiviridae
Virus genera